In logic, linear temporal logic or linear-time temporal logic (LTL) is a modal temporal logic with modalities referring to time. In LTL, one can encode formulae about the future of paths, e.g., a condition will eventually be true, a condition will be true until another fact becomes true, etc. It is a fragment of the more complex CTL*, which additionally allows branching time and quantifiers. LTL is sometimes called propositional temporal logic, abbreviated PTL.
In terms of expressive power, linear temporal logic (LTL) is a fragment of first-order logic.

LTL was first proposed for the formal verification of computer programs by Amir Pnueli in 1977.

Syntax
LTL is built up from a finite set of propositional variables AP, the logical operators ¬ and ∨, and the temporal modal operators X (some literature uses O or N) and U. 
Formally, the set of LTL formulas over AP is inductively defined as follows:
 if p ∈ AP then p is an LTL formula;
 if ψ and φ are LTL formulas then ¬ψ, φ ∨ ψ, X ψ, and φ U ψ are LTL formulas.

X is read as next and U is read as until.
Other than these fundamental operators, there are additional logical and temporal operators defined in terms of the fundamental operators, in order to write LTL formulas succinctly.
The additional logical operators are ∧, →, ↔, true, and false.
Following are the additional temporal operators.

 G for always (globally)
 F for finally
 R for release
 W for weak until
 M for mighty release

Semantics

An LTL formula can be satisfied by an infinite sequence of truth valuations of variables in AP.
These sequences can be viewed as a word on a path of a Kripke structure (an ω-word over alphabet 2AP).
Let w = a0,a1,a2,... be such an ω-word. Let w(i) = ai. Let wi = ai,ai+1,..., which is a suffix of w. Formally, the satisfaction relation ⊨ between a word and an LTL formula is defined as follows:
 w ⊨ p if p ∈ w(0)
 w ⊨ ¬ if w ⊭ 
 w ⊨  ∨  if w ⊨  or w ⊨ 
 w ⊨ X  if w1 ⊨  (in the next time step  must be true)
 w ⊨  U  if there exists i ≥ 0 such that wi ⊨  and for all 0 ≤ k < i, wk ⊨   ( must remain true until  becomes true)

We say an ω-word w satisfies an LTL formula  when w ⊨ . 
A formula  is satisfiable if there exist an ω-word w such that w ⊨ . 
A formula  is valid if for each ω-word w over alphabet 2AP, we have w ⊨ .

The additional logical operators are defined as follows:
  ∧  ≡ ¬(¬ ∨ ¬)
  →  ≡ ¬ ∨ 
  ↔  ≡ ( → ) ∧ (  → )
 true ≡ p ∨ ¬p, where p ∈ AP
 false ≡ ¬true
The additional temporal operators R, F, and G are defined as follows:
  R  ≡ ¬(¬ U ¬) (  remains true until and including once  becomes true. If  never becomes true,  must remain true forever.  releases .)
F  ≡  true U   (eventually  becomes true)
G  ≡  false R  ≡ ¬F ¬ ( always remains true)

Weak until and strong release 

Some authors also define a weak until binary operator, denoted W, with semantics similar to that of the until operator but the stop condition is not required to occur (similar to release). It is sometimes useful since both U and R can be defined in terms of the weak until:
 ψ W φ ≡ (ψ U φ) ∨ G ψ ≡ ψ U (φ ∨ G ψ) ≡  φ R (φ ∨ ψ)
 ψ U φ ≡ Fφ  ∧ (ψ W φ)
 ψ R φ ≡ φ W (φ ∧ ψ)

The strong release binary operator, denoted M, is the dual of weak until. It is defined similar to the until operator, so that the release condition has to hold at some point. Therefore, it is stronger than the release operator.
 ψ M φ ≡ ¬(¬ψ W ¬φ) ≡ (ψ R φ) ∧ F ψ ≡ ψ R (φ ∧ F ψ) ≡ φ U (ψ ∧ φ)

The semantics for the temporal operators are pictorially presented as follows.

Equivalences
Let φ, ψ, and ρ be LTL formulas. The following tables list some of the useful equivalences that extend standard equivalences among the usual logical operators.

Negation normal form

All the formulas of LTL can be transformed into negation normal form, where
 all negations appear only in front of the atomic propositions,
 only other logical operators true, false, ∧, and ∨ can appear, and
 only the temporal operators X, U, and R can appear.
Using the above equivalences for negation propagation, it is possible to derive the normal form. This normal form allows R, true, false, and ∧ to appear in the formula, which are not fundamental operators of LTL. Note that the transformation to the negation normal form does not blow up the length of the formula. This normal form is useful in translation from an LTL formula to a Büchi automaton.

Relations with other logics
LTL can be shown to be equivalent to the monadic first-order logic of order, FO[<]—a result known as Kamp's theorem— or equivalently to star-free languages.

Computation tree logic (CTL) and linear temporal logic (LTL) are both a subset of CTL*, but are incomparable. For example,
 No formula in CTL can define the language that is defined by the LTL formula F(G p).
No formula in LTL can define the language that is defined by the CTL formulas AG( p → (EXq ∧ EX¬q) ) or  AG(EF(p)).

Computational problems 
Model checking and satisfiability against an LTL formula are PSPACE-complete problems. LTL synthesis and the problem of verification of games against an LTL winning condition is 2EXPTIME-complete.

Applications

Automata-theoretic linear temporal logic model checking
An important way to model check is to express desired properties (such as the ones described above) using LTL operators and actually check if the model satisfies this property. One technique is to obtain a Büchi automaton that is equivalent to the model (accepts an ω-word precisely if it is the model) and another one that is equivalent to the negation of the property (accepts an ω-word precisely it satisfies the negated property) (cf. Linear temporal logic to Büchi automaton). The intersection of the two non-deterministic Büchi automata is empty if and only if the model satisfies the property.

Expressing important properties in formal verification
There are two main types of properties that can be expressed using linear temporal logic: safety properties usually state that something bad never happens (G¬&varphi;), while liveness properties state that something good keeps happening (GFψ or G(&varphi; →Fψ)). More generally, safety properties are those for which every counterexample has a finite prefix such that, however it is extended to an infinite path, it is still a counterexample. For liveness properties, on the other hand, every finite path can be extended to an infinite path that satisfies the formula.

Specification language
One of the applications of linear temporal logic is the specification of preferences in the Planning Domain Definition Language for the purpose of preference-based planning.

Extensions
Parametric linear temporal logic extends LTL with variables on the until-modality.

See also

Action language
Metric temporal logic
Safety and liveness properties

References

External links 
 A presentation of LTL
 Linear-Time Temporal Logic and Büchi Automata
LTL Teaching slides of professor Alessandro Artale at the Free University of Bozen-Bolzano
LTL to Buchi translation algorithms a genealogy, from the website of Spot a library for model checking.

Computer-related introductions in 1977
Temporal logic